The second season of the anime series Inuyasha aired in Japan on ytv from May 28, 2001, through December 10, 2001. Based on the manga series of the same title by Rumiko Takahashi, the anime was produced by Sunrise. The series continues a half demon Inuyasha's and a high school girl Kagome Higurashi's journey, alongside their friends Shippo, Miroku and Sango to obtain the fragments of the shattered Jewel of Four Souls, a powerful jewel that had been hidden inside Kagome's body, and keep the shards from being used for evil.

The anime is licensed for release in North America by Viz Media. The English dub of the first season was broadcast on Cartoon Network as part of its Adult Swim programming block from January 22, 2003, through May 1, 2004.

The opening themes for this season were "Change the World by V6 for episodes 28-33, and "I Am" by hitomi for episodes 34-54.



Episode list

References

2001 Japanese television seasons
2002 Japanese television seasons
Season 2